Doug Johnstone (5 August 1903 – 25 October 1985) was an Australian rules footballer who played with Footscray in the Victorian Football League (VFL).

Notes

External links 

1903 births
1985 deaths
Australian rules footballers from Melbourne
Western Bulldogs players
People from Footscray, Victoria